The Wadhwana wetland is a wetland in Dabhoi, Vadodara district in the Indian state of Gujarat. It was formed as a result of an irrigation dam in 1910. Due to its ecological significance, it was designated as a Ramsar wetland site on 2021.

Ecological significance 
The Wadhvana Wetland is considered internationally important as it provides a wintering ground to migratory water birds that migrate on the Central Asian Flyway. These water birds include endangered or near-threatened species like the Dalmatian pelican (Pelecanus crispus), Pallas's fish eagle (Haliaeetus leucoryphus), common pochard (Aythya ferina), ferruginous duck (Aythya nyroca) and grey-headed fish eagle (Icthyophaga ichthyaetus). The red-crested pochard (Netta rufina), a duck that is otherwise rare in Western India, is observed in this wetland during winter.

See also
 Nanda Lake 
 Banni grasslands

References

Ramsar sites in India
Wetlands of India
Protected areas of Gujarat